The Soyuz TMA-16 was a crewed flight to and from the International Space Station (ISS). It transported two members of the Expedition 21 crew and a Canadian entrepreneur from the Baikonur Cosmodrome in Kazakhstan to the ISS. TMA-16 was the 103rd flight of a Soyuz spacecraft, the first flight launching in 1967. The launch of Soyuz TMA-16 marked the first time since 1969 that three Soyuz craft were in orbit simultaneously.

He returned on board the Soyuz TMA-14 spacecraft left as an emergency vehicle during that previous flight. The Soyuz TMA-16 flight spacecraft flew back to Earth with only two crew members.

Crew

Backup Crew

Mission highlights 

Soyuz TMA-16 was docked to the ISS at the aft port of the Zvezda module. On January 21, 2010, cosmonaut Suraev and Expedition 22 Commander Jeffrey Williams relocated the spacecraft to the zenith-facing port of the Poisk module. The Soyuz TMA-16 spacecraft undocked from the aft end of the Zvezda service module at 5:03 a.m. EST and backed away to a distance of about 100 feet from the space station. Undocking occurred as the station flew about 213 miles high off the southwest coast of Africa. Re-docking  occurred at 5:24 a.m. EST after Suraev fired the Soyuz maneuvering thrusters to fly halfway around the orbiting space station and line up with the Poisk module.

Spaceflight participant Guy Laliberté landed aboard Soyuz TMA-14 after approximately 12 days in space while Surayev and Williams landed aboard TMA-16 in Kazakhstan on March 18, 2010.

Space tourism status 

Soyuz TMA-16 was the final flight of a space tourist to the International Space Station for more than a decade. With the imminent retirement of the Space Shuttle and the expansion of the station to six crew members, all Soyuz crew positions for the foreseeable future were to be occupied by Expedition crew until another crewed spacecraft such as Dragon 2 or Starliner was available to service the International Space Station.

References

External links

Soyuz TMA-16 tracking
Guy Laliberté in training 
Soyuz TMA-16 pictures

Crewed Soyuz missions
Spacecraft launched in 2009
Orbital space tourism missions
Spacecraft which reentered in 2010
Spacecraft launched by Soyuz-FG rockets